Salman Shahr (formerly known as Motel Ghoo  is a city in and capital of Motel Ghoo District, Abbasabad County, Mazandaran Province, Iran.  At the 2006 census, its population was 9,592, in 2,605 families.

History and Names 
Motel Ghoo is the new name for this city after the Islamic revolution. In the past, the city was called Saqikelaye and was also named after its famous hotel Motel Ghoo (Swan Motel). Salman Shahr City is a new settlement that was established in 1961 which was incorporated as a municipality in 1962.

Economy

Tourism 
Tourism is an important part of the city's economy. In the late 2000s the major development and construction projects called "Qoo" or "Diamond of the Middle East" were kicked off. The core of these projects is built in the same place as where Motel Qoo was located. This vast complex of commercial, residential, tourist, sports and entertainment include a 5-star hotel, two residential and commercial towers, a sports complex and a six-story parking garage that are built in the form of a giant ship.

 Residential high rise of Negin Pooya: Includes twin towers of 25 floors with 300 units of very stylish and modern residential apartments.
 Commercial high rise of Negin Poorya: Composed of three floors with its own entrance separate independent and separate from that of the residential tower.
 5 star deluxe international hotel of Swan: 35 floors containing 337 rooms and 14 ultra luxury accommodations with fully equipped and exceptional Royal Suites.

References

Populated places in Abbasabad County
Cities in Mazandaran Province